Leptoconchus is a genus of medium-sized sea snails, marine gastropod mollusks in the family Muricidae, subfamily Coralliophilinae, the coral snails or coral shells.

Species
The following species are currently accepted within Leptoconchus:
 Leptoconchus cumingii MassDeshayes, 1863
 Leptoconchus cyphastrae Massin, 1983
 Leptoconchus ellipticus (G. B. Sowerby I, 1823)
 Leptoconchus expolitus (Shikama, 1963)
 Leptoconchus inactiniformis A. Gittenberger & E. Gittenberger, 2011
 Leptoconchus inalbechi A. Gittenberger & E. Gittenberger, 2011
 Leptoconchus incrassa A. Gittenberger & E. Gittenberger, 2011
 Leptoconchus incycloseris A. Gittenberger & E. Gittenberger, 2011
 Leptoconchus infungites A. Gittenberger & E. Gittenberger, 2011
 Leptoconchus ingrandifungi A. Gittenberger & E. Gittenberger, 2011
 Leptoconchus ingranulosa A. Gittenberger & E. Gittenberger, 2011
 Leptoconchus inlimax A. Gittenberger & E. Gittenberger, 2011
 Leptoconchus inpileus A. Gittenberger & E. Gittenberger, 2011
 Leptoconchus inpleuractis A. Gittenberger & E. Gittenberger, 2011
 Leptoconchus inscruposa A. Gittenberger & E. Gittenberger, 2011
 Leptoconchus inscutaria A. Gittenberger & E. Gittenberger, 2011
 Leptoconchus intalpina A. Gittenberger & E. Gittenberger, 2011
 Leptoconchus lamarckii (Deshayes, 1863
 Leptoconchus massini A. Gittenberger & E. Gittenberger, 2011
 Leptoconchus peronii (Lamarck, 1818)
 Leptoconchus solidiusculus (G. B. Sowerby II, 1872)
 Leptoconchus vangoethemi Massin, 1983
Taxa inquirenda
 Leptoconchus cuvieri Deshayes, 1863
 Leptoconchus djedah (Chenu, 1843) 
 Leptoconchus globulosus (G. B. Sowerby II, 1872) 
 Leptoconchus maillardi Deshayes, 1863 
 Leptoconchus noumeae Risbec, 1953 
 Leptoconchus rostratus A. Adams, 1864 
 Leptoconchus ruppelii Deshayes, 1863 
 Leptoconchus serratus (G. B. Sowerby II, 1872) 
 Leptoconchus tenuis (Chenu, 1843) 
Species brought into synonymy include
 Leptoconchus fimbriatus (A. Adams, 1852): synonym of Coralliophila fimbriata (A. Adams, 1852)
 Leptoconchus lamarkii Deshayes, 1863: synonym of Leptoconchus lamarckii Deshayes, 1863 (incorrect original spelling)
 Leptoconchus robillardi Liénard, 1870: synonym of Coralliophila robillardi (Liénard, 1870)
 Leptoconchus schrenkii Lischke, 1871: synonym of Leptoconchus peronii (Lamarck, 1818)
 Leptoconchus striatus Rüppell, 1835: synonym of Leptoconchus peronii (Lamarck, 1818)

References

 Vaught, K.C. (1989). A classification of the living Mollusca. American Malacologists: Melbourne, FL (USA). . XII, 195 pp
 Oliverio M. (2008) Coralliophilinae (Neogastropoda: Muricidae) from the southwest Pacific. In: V. Héros, R.H. Cowie & P. Bouchet (eds), Tropical Deep-Sea Benthos 25. Mémoires du Muséum National d'Histoire Naturelle 196: 481-585. page(s): 557

External links
 Rüppell E. (1835 ["1834"). Description of a new genus of pectinibranchiated gasteropodous Mollusca (Leptoconchus). Proceedings of the Zoological Society of London. 2: 105-106.]
 Sowerby, G. B., III. (1919). Notes on Magilus and its allies, substituting the generic name Magilopsis for Leptoconchus lamarcki, Deshayes. Proceedings of the Malacological Society of London. 13(3-4): 75-77
 Deshayes, G. P. (1863). Catalogue des mollusques de l'île de la Réunion (Bourbon). Pp. 1-144. In Maillard, L. (Ed.) Notes sur l'Ile de la Réunion. Dentu, Paris
 A. & Gittenberger E. (2011) Cryptic, adaptive radiation of endoparasitic snails: sibling species of Leptoconchus (Gastropoda: Coralliophilidae) in corals. Organisms, Diversity and Evolution 11: 21-41